Rodrigo Vargas is a Bolivian footballer who plays as a forward.

References

External links
 

1994 births
Living people
Bolivian footballers
Bolivia international footballers
Bolivian expatriate footballers
Association football forwards
Bolivian Primera División players
Ukrainian Premier League players
Nacional Potosí players
Oriente Petrolero players
Club Petrolero players
The Strongest players
FC Karpaty Lviv players
Expatriate footballers in Ukraine